Stroke is a Canadian short comedy-drama film, directed by Mark Sawers and released in 1992. A satire of technology, the film stars John Maclaren as a businessman who is consumed and destroyed by the technical gadgets that are supposed to make his life easier.

The film was part of a trilogy, with Hate Mail (1993) and Shoes Off! (1998).

The film was a Genie Award nominee for Best Live Action Short Drama at the 13th Genie Awards.

The film was screened in the Un Certain Regard stream at the 1993 Cannes Film Festival.

References

External links
 

1992 films
1992 short films
Canadian comedy-drama films
Films directed by Mark Sawers
1990s English-language films
Canadian drama short films
Canadian comedy short films
1990s Canadian films
Films about disability